André Grütter (born 15 June 1976) is a Swiss snowboarder. He competed in the men's giant slalom event at the 1998 Winter Olympics.

References

External links
 

1976 births
Living people
Swiss male snowboarders
Olympic snowboarders of Switzerland
Snowboarders at the 1998 Winter Olympics
Sportspeople from Bern